Syed Waheed Ashraf is an Indian Sufi scholar and poet in Persian and Urdu. Ashraf received his B.A., M.A. and PhD (1965) degrees from Aligarh Muslim University. The title of his doctoral dissertation was A Critical Edition of Lataife Ashrafi. After serving at a number of Indian universities (Punjabi University at Patiala, M.S. University of Baroda and the University of Madras), Ashraf retired as head of the department of Arabic, Persian and Urdu at the University of Madras in 1993. Fluent in seven languages (Pahlavi, Persian, Arabic, Urdu, English, Hindi and Gujarati), he writes in Urdu, Persian and English, has written, edited or compiled over 35 books. Ashraf has focused on upholding and propagating the principles and practices of Sufism.

Biography

Parents
Ashraf traces his lineage to a family of Syeds in Kichhauchha Sharif, a small town in the district of Ambedkar Nagar, eastern Uttar Pradesh. He was born on 4 February 1933, the third child of librarian Syed Habeeb Ashraf and Syeda Saeeda. Habeeb worked in the village library; although he was enrolled at Firangi Mahal, a madrasa in Lucknow, he did not complete his education due to the death of his father. He was well-versed in Ilmul Jafar and Ilmul Ramal (Islamic geomancy). Habeeb wrote to his eldest son, Syed Amin Ashraf (who was stationed in Aligarh), six months before his death asking him to be home on 3 February 1972 for his burial.

Syeda Saeeda was the daughter of a Unani doctor in the village. Before her marriage, she assisted her father in the preparation of drugs in his dispensary and acquired a knowledge of Unani medicine (particularly diseases of women and children).

Siblings 
Habeeb and Syeda had four sons and three daughters. The two elder sons were Syed Amin Ashraf and Syed Hameed Ashraf. The youngest son (and their fifth child) was Syed Ashraf. Their daughters were Syeda Mahmooda, Syeda Masooda and Syeda Raheen. Syed Amin Ashraf received his PhD in English literature from Aligarh Muslim University, and later taught in the same department. Amin Ashraf is regarded as an accomplished poet in Urdu ghazals. He has compiled three poetic collections – Jadae Shab, Bahare Ijaad and Qafase Rang – and a collection of his papers in a book, Bargo Bar. He has received awards from Ghalib Academy, New Delhi and Uttar Pradesh Urdu Academy in Lucknow. Several critical essays about his poetry have been published. Their second son, Syed Hameed Ashraf (who died in 1993), studied Shariah at  Al Jamiatul Ashrafia Mubarakpur and Darul Uloom Deoband, received B.A., M.A. and M.Phil degrees in Arabic literature from Aligarh Muslim University and taught at a number of Indian madrasas. The title of his M.Phil disseration was, 'Allama Syed Mohammad Murtaza Zubaidi Bilgirami: hayat aur ilmi karname'. Syed Waheed Ashraf learned Islamic theology from his brother, Syed Hameed Ashraf.

Education 
Ashraf received his primary education from the village madrasa and graduated from middle school in Baskhari, a small town near his home, in 1948. He received his high-school certificate from Mohd. Hasan Inter College in Jaunpur District. After high school, Ashraf suspended his studies for seven years due to poor health. He then earned his undergraduate, postgraduate and doctoral degrees (1965) from Aligarh Muslim University.

Professional career 
After receiving his PhD, Ashraf was a temporary lecturer at Punjabi University in Patiala for a year before returning to Aligarh University as a UGC senior research fellow. In 1971, he received a permanent faculty position as a lecturer at M.S. University of Baroda in Gujarat. In 1977, Ashraf joined the University of Madras as a reader in Persian. He became a professor in 1982, and retired as head of the department of Arabic, Persian and Urdu at the University of Madras in 1993.

Spiritual odyssey 
Ashraf was devoted to Sufi literature. After completing his education at Aligarh Muslim University, he gave spiritual allegiance (baith) to Syed Qadeer Ahmad Ashrafiul Jilani in Kichaucha Sharif. He was initiated into the Ashrafiya order, and Jilani made him his successor (khalifa). Ashraf delivered lectures on Masnavi Maulan Rum at his home in Baroda.

Works

Books

Sufism and Islamic studies

Urdu
Hayate Makhdoom Syed Ashraf Jahangir Semnani(1975) Second Ed.(2017) , Maktaba Jamia Ltd, Shamshad Market, Aligarh 202002, India
Tasawwuf (Part I ) (1988),Reprint (2016) , Maktaba Jamia Ltd, Shamshad Market, Aligarh 202002, India
Tasawwuf (Part II ) (2020), Maktaba Jamia Ltd, Shamshad Market, Aligarh 202002, India
Tafsīr-e-Ashrafi (Iradat), Part I 
Tafsīr-e-Ashrafi (Bayat), Part II
Qāal-Alashraf 
Qāal-Ussufia
Me'Rāj Sharīf (2003)
Roza (1996)
Mumin (2003)
Hajje Tamattu (2010)-*Chand Duyain Aur Mukhtasar Aurade Ashrafia (Urdu and Arabic, 2007)

Persian
Jawahirus-Sulūk (translated and illustrated)
Latāif-e-Ashrafi and Maktubāt-e-Ashrafi As Sources of History of Medieval India (sponsored by the Indian Council of Historical Research)
Muqaddema-e-Latāif-e-Ashrafi. Maharaja Sayajirao University of Baroda, 1976.مقدمۀ لطايف اشرفي
Latāif-e-Ashrafi, part I (edited and annotated, 2010)
Latāif-e-Ashrafi, part II (edited and annotated, 2010)
Latāif-e-Ashrafi, part III (edited and annotated, 2010)

English
The Exoteric and Esoteric Aspects of Islamic Prayers (2005)

Poetry

Urdu
Rubai(1987)
Tajalliyāt First Ed.(1996), Second Ed.(2018) , Maktaba Jamia Ltd, Shamshad Market, Aligarh 202002, India
Munājāt First Ed.(2002), Second Ed.(2022) , Maktaba Jamia Ltd, Shamshad Market, Aligarh 202002, India
Āyāt First Ed.(1996), Second Ed.(2020) , Maktaba Jamia Ltd, Shamshad Market, Aligarh 202002, India 
Saughāt (2005)
ChaiNama (2016)
Barakaat First Ed.(2021), Maktaba Jamia Ltd, Shamshad Market, Aligarh 202002, India

Persian
Parwaaze Tafakkur (2015)
Ruba'i: Part I (2010)
Ruba'i: Part II 
Daryā Bi Qatrah (2009)

Criticism

Urdu
Fida (Pupil of Ghalib; Co-Author Malik Ram, First Edition 1983))Second Edition (2015)
Afsar Maudoodi 
Mutalae Afsar Maudoodi (2012)
Muqaddema-e-RubaiFirst Ed.(2001), Reprint (2019) , Maktaba Jamia Ltd, Shamshad Market, Aligarh 202002, India 
Urdu Zaban Mein Na'at Gū'ī Ka Fan 
Rūh-e-Mahmood 
Tauzeehāt

Persian
Tafheemāt 
Qasāid-e-Zauqi Vellori (translated, illustrated and edited)

Letters
Irtibāt-o-Inekaas (Urdu and English)

Articles

English
"The Political and Economic Thoughts of Hadrat Saiyed Ashraf Jahangir", Indo-Iranica, The Quarterly Organ of the Iran Society, Volume 56, March, June, September and December 2003, Numbers 1 to 4. Iran Society, 12 Dr. M. Ishaque Road, Kolkata 700,016.
"Avicenna's Explanation of Destiny",Indo-Iranica, The Quarterly Organ of the Iran Society,Volume-34: Nos: 1 to 4: March- Dec: 1981: IBN SINA NUMBER Iran Society, 12 Dr. M. Ishaque Road, Kolkata 700,016.
"Nationalism in Urdu Poetry" Annals of Oriental Research, University of Madras, Volume 31 (1982), p. 391.
"An Introduction to the Persian Poetry of Iqbal" in Annals of Oriental Research, University of Madras, Volume 30i (1980), p. 1-14.
"Modern Persian Prose" Annals of Oriental Research, University of Madras, Volume xxviii, part 2 p. 1-8 (1979)
"Sufism" ,Annals of Oriental Research, University of Madras, Volume  32(I) (1984), p. 55-72.
"The contribution of the House of Qutb-e-Vellore to Persian Literature" ,Annals of Oriental Research, University of Madras, pages 1–22, volume xxx part2 (1981)
"A Scholastic Approach To  Some Muslim Religious Movements In India During 14th Century A.H., Annals of Oriental Research, University of Madras, Pages 1–30, Volume xxxi part 1, (1982)

Urdu
Urdu Mein Naat Goi Ka Fan-Naat Rang- Vol. 14 (اردو میں نعت گوئی کا فن ،- ڈاکٹر سیّد وحید اشرف کچھوچھوی)
Nafhatul- Uns par Tahqeeki Nazar(1),Maarif,Darul Musannafein,Azamgarh,Jan. 1966  
Nafhatul -Uns par Tahqeeki Nazar(2),Maarif,Darul Musannafein,Azamgarh,Feb. 1966  
Tareekhe Paidaisho Wafaat Hazrat Syed Ashraf Jahangir Semnani,Maarif,Darul Musannafein,Azamgarh,Mar. 1966 
Tasawwufe Islami Par Ek Hindustani Kitaab(1),Maarif,Darul Musannafein,Azamgarh,Aug. 1968 
Tasawwufe Islami Par EK Hindustani Kitaab (2),Maarif,Darul Musannafein,Azamgarh,Sept. 1968 
Tasawwuf o Sulluk Shah Hamdani Ki Tahreeron Mein (1),Maarif,Darul Musannafein,Azamgarh,Jan. 1989 
Tasawwuf o Sulluk Shah Hamdani Ki Tahreeron Mein (2),Maarif,Darul Musannafein,Azamgarh,Feb. 1989 
Khwaja Hafiz Sheerazi Ki Shairi Mein Sulook(1),Maarif,Darul Musannafein,Azamgarh,Nov. 1991 
Khwaja Hafiz Sheerazi Ki Shairi Mein Sulook(2),Maarif,Darul Musannafein,Azamgarh, Dec. 1991 
Iqbal Ki Faarsi Shairi par Ek Ijmaali Nazar(1),Maarif,Darul Musannafein,Azamgarh,Jan.1995 
Iqbal Ki Faarsi Shairi par Ek Ijmaali Nazar(2),Maarif,Darul Musannafein,Azamgarh, Mar.1995 
Amir Khusro Bahaisiate Faarsi Rubai Nigaar,,Maarif,Darul Musannafein,Azamgarh, Feb. 2001 
Abdul Qadir Fakhri Maharban,Maarif,Darul Musannafein,Azamgarh,Oct.2002  
Hazrat Zauqi Ki Farsi Shairi,Maarif,Darul Musannafein,Azamgarh,May2003 
 Ahmad Raza Ki Farsi Aur Urdu Shairi, Al-Meezan Monthly, Bombay, Imam Ahmad Raza Number, 1976
 Masnavi Asrare Khudi Ki Fikri Buniyaad, Ziyae Wajeeh Monthly, Rampur

Persian
"Rubaiyaat (Amir Khusro)"
"Mutalae Hafiz Shirazi Az Hais Zabaano Subk Bayaan", Danish 56-57, 3645(مطالعه خواجه حافظ شیرازی از حیث زبان و سبک) -دانش،57 و 56.*3645

References

Scholars of Sufism
Sufi writers
1933 births
Living people
Barelvis
Indian Sufi saints
Sufi mystics
Sufi poets
Sufi teachers
Urdu-language writers
Chishtis
Hashemite people
People from Aligarh
People from Ambedkar Nagar district
Persian-language poets
Sufi philosophy
Academic staff of the University of Madras
Urdu-language poets from India
20th-century Indian Muslims
21st-century Indian Muslims
20th-century Indian poets
21st-century Indian poets
20th-century Muslim scholars of Islam
21st-century Muslim scholars of Islam
Scholars from Gujarat
Indian people of Arab descent